Allo is a town and municipality located in the province and autonomous community of Navarre, northern Spain. It had a population of 1,075 in 2011.

References

External links
 ALLO in the Bernardo Estornés Lasa - Auñamendi Encyclopedia (Euskomedia Fundazioa) 

Municipalities in Navarre